Itabaianinha is a municipality located in the Brazilian state of Sergipe. In 2020, its population was 42,166, and its area is 493 km².

Itabaianinha is noted for its large dwarf population. It is sometimes called "a cidade dos anões" ("the city of dwarfs"). The dwarfism is of the proportionate type and arises from a rare genetic mutation. The population probably originated through intrafamily marriages. The condition has been shown to have no effect on normal lifespan. In the late 1990s many residents of Itabaianinha under 15 years started receiving hormonal treatment. The population of dwarfs is dwindling, with only an estimated one hundred remaining, mostly in the village of Carretéis, ten miles from Itabaianinha center.

References

Municipalities in Sergipe